Predrag "Miki" Manojlović (born 5 April 1950) is a Serbian actor, famous for his starring roles in some of the most important films of former Yugoslav cinema. Since the early 1990s, he successfully branched out into movies made outside the Balkans and became active in productions all over Europe.

Career

Manojlović grew up in a family of stage actors Ivan Manojlović and Zorka Doknić.

After his screen debut in 1970, young Predrag continued to appear in numerous films and TV dramas made in SFR Yugoslavia, some of which, like the 1975 TV series Grlom u jagode where he memorably played Miki Rubiroza, achieved cult status.

He is arguably best known for the role of the father in Emir Kusturica's 1985 film When Father Was Away on Business and as a tragic opportunist in 1995's Underground (also by Kusturica). He is known for his versatility which helped him make a strong impression both in starring and character roles, as well as dramas and comedies, with his small role in the 1992 hit comedy Mi nismo anđeli being an example of the latter.  He played the role of Agostino Tassi in the 1997 film Artemisia and that of Miki in Irina Palm.

During the NATO bombardments in 1999, Miki said: "Westerners must understand that no one can constrain anybody, that the Balkans need to live their own life with their own multiplicity of cultures, religions, languages. They must understand that they should not worsen the situation with their own frustrations and their ideas which do not function, that the more bombs fall in Yugoslavia, the less safety will there be in Europe."

In February 2009, the Government of Serbia named him the president of the Serbian Film Center.

Personal life
Manojlović is married to actress Tamara Vučković with whom he has a son Ivan. He has a daughter Čarna Manojlović from a previous marriage.

Filmography

Otpisani (TV series) (1974)
Košava (1974)
Priča o vojniku (1976)
Hajka (1977)
Posljednji podvig diverzanta Oblaka (1978)
Sok od šljiva (1981)
Piknik u Topoli (1981)
Samo jednom se ljubi (1981)
Sezona mira u Parizu (1981)
13. jul (1982)
Nešto između (1983)
U raljama života (1984)
Tajvanska kanasta (1985)
Jagode u grlu (1985)
Otac na službenom putu (1985)
Za sreću je potrebno troje (1985)
Race for the Bomb (TV miniseries) (1987)
Vuk Karadžić (TV series) (1987)
Vreme čuda (1989)
Seobe (1989)
Un week-end sur deux (1990)
Mi nismo anđeli (1992)
Tito i ja (1992)
Tango Argentino (1992)
La Piste du télégraphe (1994)
Underground (1995)
Someone Else's America (1995)
Portraits chinois (1996)
Gypsy Magic (1997)
Artemisia (1997)
Il Macellaio (1998)
Rane (1998)
Bure baruta (1998)
Crna mačka, beli mačor (1998)
Set Me Free (Emporte-moi) (1999)
Rien à dire (1999)
Les Amants criminels (1999)
Voci (2000)
Épouse-moi (2000)
Sans plomb (2000)
Mortel transfert (2001)
Jeu de cons (2001)
Kako loš son (2002)
Les Marins perdus (2003)
Mali svet (2003)
Tor zum Himmel (2003)
Mathilde (2004)
Hurensohn (2004)
Ne fais pas ça (2004)
100 minuta slave (2004)
Mi nismo anđeli 2 (2005)
Ze film (2005)
L'Enfer (2005)
La Fine del mare (2007)
Klopka (2007)
Irina Palm (2007)
Hadersfild (2007)
Zavet (2007)
Svetat e golyam i spasenie debne otvsyakade (2008)
Largo Winch (2008)
Solemn Promise (2009)
Just Between Us (2010)
Cirkus Columbia (2010)
The Burma Conspiracy (2011)
The Judgement (2014)
On the Milky Road (2016)
Cherchez la femme (2017)

References

External links 

 

1950 births
Living people
Male actors from Belgrade
20th-century Serbian male actors
Golden Arena winners
Vladimir Nazor Award winners
Croatian Theatre Award winners
21st-century Serbian writers
20th-century Serbian writers
21st-century Serbian male actors
Serbian male film actors
Serbian male television actors
Serbian male stage actors
Serbian male voice actors
Serbian film directors
Serbian theatre directors
Serbian television directors
Serbian dramatists and playwrights
Laureates of the Ring of Dobrica